A large fraction of the chemical elements that occur naturally on the earth's surface are essential to the structure and metabolism of living things. Four of these elements (hydrogen, carbon, nitrogen, and oxygen) are essential to every living thing and collectively make up 99% of the mass of protoplasm. Phosphorus and sulfur are also common essential elements, essential to the structure of nucleic acids and amino acids, respectively. Chlorine, potassium, magnesium, calcium and phosphorus have important roles due to their ready ionization and utility in regulating membrane activity and osmotic potential. The remaining elements found in living things are primarily metals that play a role in determining protein structure. Examples include iron, essential to hemoglobin; and magnesium, essential to chlorophyll. Some elements are essential only to certain taxonomic groups of organisms, particularly the prokaryotes. For instance, the lanthanide series rare earths are essential for methanogens. As shown in the following table, there is strong evidence that 19 of the elements are essential to all living things, and another 17 are essential to some taxonomic groups. Of these 17, most have not been extensively studied, and their biological importance may be greater than currently supposed.

The remaining elements are not known to be essential. There appear to be several causes of this.

 Apart from the known essential elements, most elements have only received direct biological study in connection with their significance to human health; this has incidentally included study of some laboratory animals such as chickens and rats, and plants of agricultural importance. There is evidence that certain elements are essential to groups other than humans, but there has been little effort to systematically study any group other than humans or laboratory animals to determine the effects of deficiency of uncommon elements, and for these groups knowledge is largely limited to information that has been gathered incidentally to study of other aspects of each organism.
 The noble gases helium, neon, argon, krypton, xenon are nonreactive and have no known direct biological role — albeit xenon nevertheless very surprisingly exhibits both anesthetic and neuroprotective side-effects despite usually being considered "chemically inert," and can activate at least one human transcription factor. (Radon is radioactive, discussed below.)
 Some elements are very rare on the earth's surface and any lifeform to which these were essential would have limited habitat and possibly a limited term of existence as geological change altered the availability of these elements. Examples are rhodium and tantalum.
 Some elements readily substitute for other, more common elements in molecular structures; e.g. bromine often substitutes for chlorine, or tungsten for molybdenum. Sometimes this substitution has no biological effect; sometimes it has an adverse effect.
 Many elements are benign, meaning that they generally neither help nor harm organisms, but may be bioaccumulated. However, since the literature on these "benign" elements is almost entirely focused on their role in humans and laboratory animals, some of them may eventually be found to have an essential role in other organisms. In the following table are 56 benign elements.
 A few elements have been found to have a pharmacologic function in humans (and possibly in other living things as well; the phenomenon has not been widely studied). In these, a normally nonessential element can treat a disease (often a micronutrient deficiency). An example is fluorine, which reduces the effects of iron deficiency in rats.
 Some of the benign elements are radioactive. As such they alter life due to their potential to cause mutations. This effect could be interpreted as either adverse or beneficial, but since mutation would proceed even in the absence of ionizing radiation, these mutagenic elements are not essential to living things.
 All elements with atomic number 95 or higher are synthetic and radioactive with a very short half-life. These elements have never existed on the surface of the earth except in minute quantities for very brief time periods. None have any biological significance.

Aluminum warrants special mention because it is the most abundant metal and the third most abundant element in the Earth's crust; despite this, it is not essential for life. With this sole exception, the eight most highly abundant elements in the earth's crust, making up over 90% of the crustal mass, are also essential for life.

The following list identifies in rank order the possible biological roles of the chemical elements, ranging from a score of 5 for elements essential to all living things, to a score of 1 for elements that have no known effects on living things. There are also letter scores for special functions of the elements. These rank scores are used to characterize each element in the following table.

The following table identifies the 94 chemical elements that occur naturally on the earth's surface, their atomic numbers, their biological rank as defined above, and their general beneficial and harmful roles in living things.

See also

https://www.britannica.com/science/transition-metal/Biological-functions-of-transition-metals

References

Essential nutrients